Magic Box may refer to:

 The Magic Box, a 1951 British movie
 The Magic Box (TV show), a 1990s TV show on The Learning Channel 
 The Magic Box (2002 film), a Tunisian drama film
 Siegfried & Roy: The Magic Box, a 1999 film directed by Brett Leonard
 Magic Box (The Loved Ones album), 1967
 Magic Box (Bel Canto album), 1996
 DNA magic box, a machine that performs rapid DNA chemical analysis